Khuyeh (also Romanized as Khūyeh and Khooyeh; also known as Khūyeh Pā’īn and Khūyeh-ye Soflá) is a village in Miankuh-e Moguyi Rural District, in the Central District of Kuhrang County, Chaharmahal and Bakhtiari Province, Iran. At the 2006 census, its population was 855, in 142 families. The village is populated by Lurs.

References 

Populated places in Kuhrang County
Luri settlements in Chaharmahal and Bakhtiari Province